is the protagonist of Paru Itagaki's manga series Beastars. In a world of modern, civilized, anthropomorphic animals with a cultural divide between carnivores and herbivores, Legoshi is a high school student and gray wolf working with his red deer classmate Louis on settling tensions in the club at school. When meeting a rabbit called Haru, Legoshi becomes instantly in love with her and goes across the narrative dealing with the dilemma of a carnivore having a romantic relationship with a rabbit while also exploring a scent that made him nearly want to devour her.

In the anime adaptation of the manga, Legoshi was voiced by Chikahiro Kobayashi in Japanese and Jonah Scott in English.

Legoshi has been a popular character in manga and anime. He was praised for the portrayal given in the narrative as a result of his coming-of-age arc conflicted with the series' setting, as well as his heroic characterization when searching for the murderer in the series' second season.

Creation

Paru Itagaki said that her main inspiration for Legoshi was Mathieu Amalric. She first saw the actor's work through Le Scaphandre et le papillon, a film in which he plays a completely paralyzed character who can only get his messages and his emotions through the eyes. This inspired the quiet Legoshi, so she had to find a way to make him expressive by the look. The author thinks that it was this point that interested me a lot in the work at eye level. Certain characters, like Legoshi, were planned in mind her adolescence. They have evolved since then, and the author have gradually created a story for them and Beastars is the perfect opportunity to stage them.

The story develops in a world of anthropomorphic animals that live in perfect harmony, starts with the murder of Tem the Alpaca. Instantaneously, all focus shifts to the carnivore closest to the young one that is no other than Legoshi. However, the gray wolf is a sensitive and reserved person incapable of killing anybody, representing the total opposite of a ferocious carnivore. For this reason, the history is led by a character such as Legoshi, whose vision of the world, the author recognized. Itagaki said most importantly, she felt shy about having Legoshi do anything that seemed "manly". He certainly did not go out of his way to act as such. The author further thinks there was some distance in character between himself and Legoshi. She thinks he has grown to be a proper protagonist. Itagaki's demographic split down the middle for gender. Itagaki was glad so many people sympathize with Legoshi. In regard to the character's design, Legoshi feels more beastlike in color. Had the author made up their colors, it would feel fake. Itagaki stated that she chose to make a wolf character as their similarity to dogs make them familiar to readers and that wolves' "sneaking around" makes them "cute". The name "Legoshi" refers to actor Bela Lugosi while she used Amalric as a model for Legoshi's face. She stated, "I sometimes think of Kenichi Matsuyama when I'm drawing the body."

Casting
The character is voiced by Chikahiro Kobayashi in Japanese. Kobayashi auditioned in the studio, but just before recording the audition tape, it happened to appear on the recommended display displayed in the advertisement on the internet which surprised him. He was told that he could take both with Louis, but he only received Legoshi, as he found easier to interpret for being less cool. His impressions of the role were that Legoshi was a very complex wolf due to the setting due to the handling of animals. In regard to his personality, Kobayashi found him as a clumsy child, which changed upon meeting Haru. In the case of Legoshi, he did not find many changes in the narrative as he felt his arc delicate and stubborn. He related Legoshi to his own youth. He found the love triangle between Legoshi, Haru and Louis complex due to how close all the three are. In the first episode, Legoshi becomes obesessed with eating Haru upon smelling something which gave him a strong impression in regard to what is Legoshi's true self. At first, the impression he got reading the script was that Legoshi should be mysterious. He added he was kind of creepy, too different in the drama club with none of them knowing his depths. Kobayashi often tried sounding calmer or stronger in different scenes from the first season, as he noted Legoshi tended to act differently based on the character he is related with. His final impression of Legoshi was that he was hard to express emotions, which is why it is misleading and clumsy, so even though he had played so far, Kobayashi wonder if this can be conveyed while playing. The actor used different tools while recording the anime to produce the pitch he needed.

Jonah Scott voices the character in English. Scott originally auditioned for three roles and became nervous when learning that Legoshi, his chosen part, was the lead of the series, something which left a major impact in his career and no knowledge about it. He was primiarly attracted by his role due to how Beastars explores sexuality and love in a way that might attract only young adults.

Appearances
Legoshi, 17 years old at the start of the story but turns 18 years old in Volume 14, is a towering gray wolf. A second-year student, Legoshi works as a member of the drama club's stage crew, and enjoys watching tragic stories performed despite never having had to directly participate in them. He attempts to hide his more terrifying traits in order to better acquaint his herbivore classmates. He takes it upon himself to solve the murder of Tem. Generally conflicted with his status as a carnivore, Legoshi wishes to suppress his predatory desires, which become even more complicated as he develops confused feelings towards a dwarf rabbit named Haru. Legoshi also has a complicated past, having mostly been raised by his Komodo dragon maternal grandfather Gosha, as Legoshi's hybrid wolf-Komodo dragon mother Leano had mostly withdrawn from life and committed suicide when Legoshi was 12. Legoshi inherited Gosha's Komodo dragon eyes with small pupils and an immunity to Komodo dragon venom, though Legoshi himself is not venomous. Jack knows about Legoshi's heritage, but few others do, and at school Legoshi is registered only as a gray wolf.

Reception

Popularity
Legoshi was nominated to the 5th Crunchyroll Anime Awards under the category Best Male Character. Legoshi and Haru were also voted as one of the Best Couples in anime in Anitrendz.

Critical reception
Upon his introduction, Anime News Network commented on Legoshi's characterization due to how, while his attraction to Haru is obvious, the way he reacts towards her sexual intercourse proposal, makes him come across as a more active character, making the narrative more interesting. In another review of the manga where the narrative explores Legoshi's dilemma in regard to his attraction towards Haru, Anime News Network stated that it further explores the world building and the possibility of a carnivore developing such interest for Haru, or it is just his instincts deceiving the teenager's mind. However, when Legoshi once again interacts with Haru, the critic commented that the comments Legoshi does not understand about Haru are directly linked to real life women who fear being attacked in contrast to the social norms of males and carnivores. In conclusion, the writer felt that by those volumes, Itagaki did not provide a message to the readers in regard to Legoshi's desire, listing it as a con. Thrillist simply described Legoshi as "a conflicted grey wolf and the antisocial protagonist that 2020 deserves" and praised how the anime makes a major change in Legoshi when he decides to win Haru's attraction rather than being passive and not staying close to her. HobbyConsolas also praised the relationship between Haru and Legoshi as the best part of the series due to how it is portrayed; while The Collider found it as a subversion of common tropes often found in fiction due to Legoshi's shy personality and Haru's interest in sex, and stated "The Beast, in this case, is Legoshi, a rather shy and sensitive gray wolf who spends time alongside carnivores and herbivores alike at Cherryton School's drama club. Legoshi struggles to come to terms with his innate, natural instincts as a carnivore and the conflicting feelings of love and sexual attraction to the diminutive rabbit".

For the second season of the anime, which focused on the mystery genre, IGN enjoyed Legoshi's role as he searched for a murderer but noted that his obsession towards his goal pushes Haru away from him. Otaquest called Legoshi and Louis as the main focus of the second season which might bother fans of Haru is featured less prominently but still enjoyed the handling of Legoshi as he searches for Tem's murderer. In regard to the final battle, Comic Book Resources enjoyed the handling of the friendship between Legoshi and Louis as the latter offers his own flesh to help the former become stronger and defeat the killing, sealing it as their sign of friendship. The Fandom Post felt that Legoshi's bond with Louis produced both tension and comedy due to how Legoshi reacts when learning that the missing Louis was alive and working with the Shishigumi. Vincent Jule of the french newspaper 20 minutes praised the personality of the character and described him as "like the students of Cherryton School, consumption of meat prohibited, dormitories separated according to diets. Everything is done to repress the instinct of carnivores, starting with the hero Legoshi who, behind the big bad wolf, hides a sensitive, shy, and clumsy personality".

References

External links
 
 

Anthropomorphic wolves
Fictional lizards
Fictional wolves
Male characters in anime and manga
Teenage characters in anime and manga
Wolves in literature